Lucky Colour Blue is an Australian TV series which first screened on the ABC in 1975. It was a sequel to 1973 television series A Taste for Blue Ribbons.

Lucky Colour Blue was produced by Christopher Muir and written by Virginia Duigan.

Cast
 Sally Conabere		
 Timothy Good	
 Vivean Gray
 Vynka Lee-Steere
 Brendon Lunney
 Max Meldrum

References

External links

Australian drama television series
English-language television shows
1975 Australian television series debuts
1975 Australian television series endings
Australian Broadcasting Corporation original programming